Ophiusa finifascia  is a moth of the family Erebidae. It is found in Africa, including South Africa and the Comores.

References

Africanmoths: pictures & distribution map

Ophiusa
Moths of the Comoros
Moths of Africa
Moths described in 1855